Worlds of Wonder is a collection of three science fiction works by Olaf Stapledon: a short novel, a novella and a short story.  It was published in 1949 by Fantasy Publishing Company, Inc. in an edition of 500 copies.  All of the stories had originally been published in the United Kingdom.

Contents
 Death into Life
 The Flames
 Old Man in a New World

References

1949 short story collections
Science fiction short story collections
Fantasy Publishing Company, Inc. books